David George Thompson (born 20 November 1968 in Ashington) is an English former professional footballer who played in the Football League for Millwall, Cambridge United, Bristol City, Blackpool and Brentford as a central defender.

Career statistics

References

External links 
 

1968 births
Living people
English footballers
Sportspeople from Ashington
Footballers from Northumberland
Millwall F.C. players
Bristol City F.C. players
Blackpool F.C. players
Cambridge United F.C. players
Yeovil Town F.C. players
Cambridge City F.C. players
Brentford F.C. players
Association football central defenders
English Football League players
National League (English football) players